A Road and a Will is a 1997 Hong Kong television drama produced by TVB and starring Lawrence Cheng, Wayne Lai, Maggie Cheung Ho-yee and Cutie Mui. The series was broadcast on TVB Jade from 26 May to 20 June 1997 and was re-aired several times in June 1999, March 2004 and August 2007.

Plot
A drama depicting the struggle of Sam (Lawrence Cheng), a senior executive in Hong Kong who has been laid off unexpectedly, in starting a business in Guangzhou. Sam was torn apart when his wife, Chow Mo-chi (Claudia Lau) prompted him with a divorce after he lost his job. Distressed, he decided to go to Guangzhou for a new start and retracts his ancestral house. There, he lands in a dispute with a local merchant named Ng Kin-ngai (Wayne Lai). Fortunately, with the help of Mo-chi's cousin, Chai Ho-fung (Maggie Cheung), Sam and Kin-ngai finally come to terms with each other.

The story then goes on to portray the change of attitude of Sam towards the people in Guangzhou from prejudice to appreciation and harmony.

Cast

The Yue family (Hong Kong)
Lawrence Cheng as Sam Yue Wing-tit (余穎鐵), The second son of the Yue family, who is a toy designer that has designed many action figures and games. Due his lack of the heart to fight, his boss fired him saying that he is not working hard enough. He then goes to Guangzhou, China, where he is not fond of, with the identity of a Hong Kong businessman of make-up products, and marries Chow Mo-chi in back in Hong Kong. Later in China, he develops a relationship with Chai Ho-fung, but later things changed when marriage was being discussed.
Claudia Lau as Chow Mo-chi (周慕慈), Sam's wife who is a smart and profession type woman. Due to Sam going to Guangzhou to develop his career, they divorced. The relationship then goes on and off but finally reconciled in the end.
Cho Tat-wah as Yue Yung (余勇), Sam's father
Carlo Ng as Yue Wing-sek (余穎錫), Sam's youngest brother who is greatly loved by his father. He studies at the Guangzhou Keinan College. During the peak of his education, his friend invited him to go into business and thus he abandoned his education.
Josie Ho as Yue Wing-kam (余穎金), Sam's younger sister
Ching Siu-lung as Yue Wing-kong (余穎鋼), Sam's older brother
Cho Chung as Ying Hung (映紅), Wing-kong's wife who has knowledge of make-up products and once helped Sam on his business.
Tse Man-hin as Yu Tung (余銅), Wing-kong and Hung's son

The Ng family (China)
Wayne Lai as Ng Kin-ngai (吳堅毅), a flower land merchant from Chan Village, Shunde and speaks with a strong Shundeness accent. Due to his village leader collecting his land, he moved to Guangzhou and met Sam Yue. Had a dispute with Sam when he rented Sam's ancestral home for operating business. Due to the failure of the China stock market, he and Sam became friends and they both operate a business of flower and plants. He has unsuccessfully tried to pursue Yue Wing-lam and his cousin, Chai Ho-fung.
Cutie Mui as Wong Fung (王凰), Kin-ngai's childhood friend who is a kind village girl who is rigid in love. She loves Kin-ngai but due to her personality, she was always reprimanded by him. She and Kin-ngai marries in the end.
Gordon Liu as Wong Ling-fu (王令富), Fung's father who wears black framed glasses and likes to sing songs about the Cultural Revolution and saying the slogan.

The Chai family (China)
The Chai family and Ng family are relatives.

Maggie Cheung Ho-yee as Chai Ho-fung (柴可風), who has a standard look and works in the bank and is Guangzhou's new generation of female. She helped his cousin in-law Sam gain back his ancestral home and thus, meeting him. She and Sam develop and relationship and was almost in talks of marriage but she believes she is the third party in Sam and Mo-chi's marriage and thus she left.
Hou Guanqun as Chai Cheng-kong (柴井崗), Ho-fung's father
Wallis Pang as Chai Ho Kwai (柴可貴), Ho-fung's younger sister

P&D Toy Company
Ben Wong as Gordon, Sam's superior
Bruce Li as Ben, Sam's colleague
Timothy Siu as Chicken, Sam's colleague

Other cast
Joe Ma as Peter
Hoyan Mok as Amigo, Mo-chi's good friend.

External links
Official Website
TVBI Official Website

TVB dramas
Hong Kong television shows
Serial drama television series
Hong Kong romance television series
1997 Hong Kong television series debuts
1997 Hong Kong television series endings
1990s Hong Kong television series